David or Dave Burgess may refer to:

David Burgess (footballer), New Zealand international association football player
Sonia Burgess (born David Burgess), immigration and human rights lawyer (1947–2010)
David Burgess, English murderer of three girls in Beenham, England
David Luther Burgess (1891–1960), Canadian World War I flying ace and politician
Dave Burgess (footballer) (born 1960), English footballer
Dave Burgess (politician) (born c. 1959), Canadian politician
Dave Burgess (guitarist) for The Champs

See also
David Burgess-Wise, automobile historian